Darija Alauf (born 25 December 1968) is a Yugoslav swimmer. She competed in two events at the 1992 Summer Olympics.

References

External links

1968 births
Living people
Yugoslav female swimmers
Olympic swimmers as Independent Olympic Participants
Swimmers at the 1992 Summer Olympics
Mediterranean Games medalists in swimming
Mediterranean Games bronze medalists for Yugoslavia
Swimmers at the 1991 Mediterranean Games